Harold "Circus" Owen Hayward (1883–1970) was a New Zealand rugby football player who represented New Zealand in both rugby union and rugby league. His brother, Morgan, also represented New Zealand in rugby league.

Rugby union career
Growing up in Thames, Hayward played rugby union for the Goldfields sub-union and represented Auckland. His 33 appearances for Auckland between 1903 and 1911 were, however, sparadoic – undoubtedly because he lived so far away from the city.

Hayward played for New Zealand against the touring Anglo-Welsh Lions in on 25 July 1908. He also made his sole appearance for the North Island in 1908.

Rugby league career
Hayward switched to rugby league in 1912 and made an immediate impact, playing for Thames, Auckland and touring Australia with New Zealand that year. Like Goldfields, Thames was a sub-league of the Auckland Rugby League at the time.

Hayward captained the 1913 New Zealand tour of Australia and played for Auckland against Great Britain in 1914.

Return to rugby union
Hayward returned to rugby union after World War One.

References

1883 births
1970 deaths
Auckland rugby league team players
Auckland rugby union players
New Zealand international rugby union players
New Zealand national rugby league team captains
New Zealand national rugby league team players
New Zealand rugby league players
New Zealand rugby union players
North Island rugby union players
Rugby league locks
Thames rugby league team players